Le Cannet-des-Maures is a commune in the Var department in the Provence-Alpes-Côte d'Azur region in southeastern France.

History
The town was called "Cannet" until the French Revolution, and later "Le Cannet".
During World War II on 15 of June 1940, the airfield was attacked by 25 Italian fighters Fiat C.R.42s that strafed about 20 French aircraft destroying some of them.

See also
Communes of the Var department

References

External links

Communes of Var (department)